The Reunion is the second studio album by rap duo Capone-N-Noreaga. It is not as critically acclaimed as their first album, The War Report, but did feature a number of well-received tracks, most notably "Invincible," produced by east coast producer/DJ DJ Premier. Because of a manufacturing error, the album was released with two catalog numbers.

Critical reception

Steve 'Flash' Juon of RapReviews was intrigued by The Reunion for striking "a delicate balance between the "thugs" and the "backpackers" in the much fractured hip-hop scene today on the East coast", singling out "Bang Bang" and "Invincible" as highlights, but was critical of the guest contributions on "Don't Know Nobody" and "Straight Like That", concluding that: "[W]ith Capone giving Noreaga the balance he has always needed and Noreaga helping Capone keep his name alive in the business, the return of this talented duo is long overdue and well received [...] It's not a perfect return, but we're glad their back." A writer for HipHopDX commended the duo for maintaining their "lyrical chemistry" and the beats from DJ Premier ("Invincible"), The Alchemist ("Bang Bang") and Mobb Deep ("Queens Finest") but felt the rest of the track listing lacked the thug intensity found in their debut effort, concluding that: "Overall, The Reunion is a mediocre album, not bad but not great either." Despite highlighting both "Bang Bang" and "Invincible" as standout tracks, AllMusic's Matt Conaway saw the record as a "step backward" for the duo, with guest contributions being "more detrimental than beneficial", saying it "sounds like a hurried project, one where the material has been compromised just to get product on the streets."

Track listing

Samples
"Bang Bang"
"Abstract Atmospheric" by Anthony Phillips
"B EZ"
"Theme From "The Night Visitor" by Henry Mancini
"Intro: A Change Is Gonna Come"
"A Change Is Gonna Come" by Sam Cooke
"Invincible"
"Hey Boy Over There" by Jimmie and Vella
"T.O.N.Y. (Top of New York)" by Capone-N-Noreaga
"Phonetime"
"Julie's Theme" by John Frizzell
"Queens"
"Living Is Good" by Wendy Waldman
"Straight Like That"
"Symphony No. 25" by Wolfgang Amadeus Mozart
"Full Steezy"
"Islands in the Stream" by Kenny Rogers and Dolly Parton
"Gunz & Cash"
"Theme for the Losers" by Henry Mancini

Charts

Singles

References 

2000 albums
Capone-N-Noreaga albums
Tommy Boy Records albums
Albums produced by the Alchemist (musician)
Albums produced by Dame Grease
Albums produced by DJ Premier
Albums produced by Havoc (musician)
Albums produced by Lord Finesse